Lucy Evelina Metcalf Akerman (February 21, 1816 – February 21, 1874) was an American Unitarian writer.

This daughter of Thomas Metcalf was born in Wrentham, Massachusetts and married Charles Akerman of Portsmouth, New Hampshire.  She also lived in Providence, Rhode Island.

She wrote the hymn "Nothing but Leaves, the Spirit Grieves", (circa 1858) that was chiefly used by the Baptists.

References

1816 births
1874 deaths
American Protestant hymnwriters
19th-century American writers
19th-century American musicians
19th-century American women writers
American women hymnwriters
American women non-fiction writers
19th-century American women musicians